The following is a list of churches in Denbighshire, Wales.

Active churches

Defunct churches

References 

Denbighshire